Devin Britton and Jeff Dadamo were defending champions, but Britton decided not to participate.
Dadamo teamed up with Mischa Zverev but lost to Kevin King and Juan Carlos Spir in the first round.
Yuki Bhambri and Michael Venus claimed the title, by beating Somdev Devvarman and Jack Sock 2–6, 6–2, [10–8]

Seeds

Draw

Draw

References
 Main Draw

Nielsen Pro Tennis Championship - Doubles
2013 Doubles